There were 11 female and 39 male athletes representing the country at the 2000 Summer Paralympics.

Medallists

See also
Finland at the 2000 Summer Olympics
Finland at the Paralympics

References

Bibliography

External links
International Paralympic Committee

Nations at the 2000 Summer Paralympics
Paralympics
2000